Timothy Grant Leighton   (born 16 October 1963) is the Professor of Ultrasonics and Underwater Acoustics at the University of Southampton. He is the inventor-in-chief of Sloan Water Technology Ltd., a company founded around his inventions. 
He is an academician of three national academies. Trained in physics and theoretical physics, he works across physical, medical, biological, social and ocean sciences, fluid dynamics and engineering. He joined the Institute of Sound and Vibration Research (ISVR) at the University of Southampton in 1992 as a lecturer in underwater acoustics, and completed the monograph The Acoustic Bubble in the same year. He was awarded a personal chair at the age of 35 and has authored over 400 publications.

Education
He was educated at Heversham Grammar School, Cumbria and Magdalene College, Cambridge where he studied the Natural Sciences Tripos and awarded a double first class Bachelor of Arts degree with honours in physics and theoretical Physics in 1985, obtaining a PhD in 1988 at the Cavendish Laboratory, University of Cambridge.
Following his PhD, he was awarded senior and advanced research fellowships at Magdalene College, Cambridge funded by the Engineering and Physical Sciences Research Council (EPSRC).

Early career
He joined the Institute of Sound and Vibration Research (ISVR) at the University of Southampton in 1992 as a lecturer in underwater acoustics, and completed the monograph The Acoustic Bubble in the same year. He was awarded a personal chair at the age of 35.

Research

He founded and leads two research organisations he founded (Global-NAMRIP and HEFUA), is a director and inventor-in-chief of Sloan Water Technology Ltd., and talks extensively to schoolchildren, the public, and on radio and video.

His research covers medical, humanitarian and environmental sciences, beginning with the fundamental mathematics and ending with engineering applications. His research interests cover acoustical oceanography, antimicrobial resistance, biomedical ultrasound, carbon capture and storage, climate change, decontamination, hospital acquired infections, marine zoology, fluid dynamics, ultrasound and underwater acoustics. 
Such fields as cold water cleaning, sound in space, ultrasound in air, BiaPSS, TWIPR, and passive acoustic lithortripsy monitoring, pushed pioneering research into game-changing technology.  as opposed to incremental research that is published but falls short of societal benefit:

He worked as part of the team investigating whether man-made sounds can adversely affect benthic species (marine life that inhabits the seabed). Such species have been overlooked in studies on how man-made sounds affect whales, dolphins and fish: benthic species find it far harder to relocate away from adverse sounds than do these other more mobile species. Furthermore, benthic species play a key role in the health of the marine sediment, turning it over and preventing it stagnating, and are key to the health of coastal marine environments.

With other teams he developed methods to assess which fish species are most at-risk from man-made noise in the oceans, and quantified such noise from shipping. Turning the problem on its head, he worked with other teams on how to use sound as 'underwater acoustic scarecrows' to guide fish away from regions of man-made danger. These might occurs, for example, where industry exacts cooling water from rivers used as migration paths of endangered species (the young of European eel are slim enough for the flow to pull them through grills placed over such extraction points).  (key collaborator: Paul White)

NAMRIP and Global-NAMRIP
The Global Network for AntiMicrobial Resistance and Infection Prevention (Global-NAMRIP), is a multidisciplinary research team of hundreds researchers and end users, across four continents, including engineers, chemists, microbiologists, environmental scientists, veterinary and human medics, clinicians who contribute to international and national antibiotic guidelines for specified conditions, experts in food, ethics and law, crucially networked with economists, geographers, health scientists and experts from other social science disciplines to provide a truly joined up approach to antimicrobial resistance (AMR) and infection prevention (offsetting the loss of diversity in pharmaceutical industry research teams). As Leighton said at NAMRIP's 2016 conference:
 

Global-NAMRIP was set up to search for such solutions and mitigations, with particular emphasis to finding alternatives to the oft-cited route of simply funding drug companies to produce more antibiotics. According to the New Scientist,:

Global-NAMRIP creates new research teams, commissions new research, engaging with industry to roll out solutions to society, and engaging with the public and policymakers to conduct outreach, education and dialogue. The award-winning Public Engagement and Policymaker Engagement programmes that Leighton devised and leads have been mentioned in Parliament by the Under-Secretary of State for Health on 16 November 2017. and Leighton has addressed the Parliamentary and Scientific Committee on his approach to addressing the threat of AMR.

Global-NAMRIP particularly supports Low/Middle Income Countries with not-for-profit interventions, for example with initiatives in urban and rural Ghana (infection being the primary cause of death in rural Ghana). In Uganda in 2019, Global-NAMRIP members from Uganda, Liberia, Malawi, Kenya, Ghana, Ethiopia and the UK met to compare, for the first time, the national AMR strategies of their respective countries, to share best practice. The meeting also produced significant impact in education, support for young innovators, and responded to a request from the Ugandan Minister for Health to write for him the 'Kampala Declaration on AMR'.

Health Effects of Ultrasound in Air
In 2015, Leighton founded the research group Health Effects of Ultrasound in Air (HEFUA). His aim was to map the increasing use of ultrasound in public places, and to investigate whether or not this increase is having adverse effects on some humans (following an investigation which revealed that the use of ultrasound in public places is increasing, and that guidelines were inadequate prior to the 2016 report).

His 2016 report that first raised the issues was, in the first 2 years, downloaded over 20,000 times from the Royal Society website, leading to requests for a follow-up, a journal special issue, and numerous conference sessions worldwide as the importance of this topic was realised. Scientists, engineers and the public around the world are now logging the location and type of device that emits ultrasound. Leighton became an acknowledged world expert on such public exposures, and on the claims of 'sonic attacks' on US Embassy staff in Cuba and China. His expertise on the effect on humans of ultrasound in air provided the scientific basis that was cited by Giles Watling MP (Clacton, Conservative) in the Motion for leave to bring in a Bill (Standing Order No. 23) on "Anti-loitering Devices (Regulation)" (17 July 2018 Volume 645, 2.06 pm). 

In 2018, Leighton published an editorial that identified flaws in the way the statistical analysis was conducted on those identified as victims of the attack, which set up the tests in such a way that even unexposed people would, for the most part, be identified as suffering adverse health effects from the exposure. In 2023, the US Office of the Director of National Intelligence (ODNI) agreed with this assessment, stating ‘that initial medical studies that led experts to believe that the AHIs [anomalous health incidents] “represented a novel medical syndrome or consistent pattern of injuries” suffered from “methodological limitations”’.  Consequently, it reported that an inter-agency intelligence analysis from 7 agencies concluded that 5 considered it ‘very unlikely’ (one judging it ‘unlikely’, and one abstaining from an opinion) at a foreign adversary had deployed a weapon in the attacks.

He currently serves on the Scientific Expert Group of the  International Commission on Non-Ionizing Radiation Protection  to support appropriate protections for people (particularly children) exposed to airborne ultrasound.

Extraterrestrial acoustics
 Predicting the soundscapes of other worlds and how these could best be exploited using acoustic devices, led to devices for planetaria to use when teaching about other worlds, and showed how careful calculation was needed to avoid mistakes when using acoustic sensors on other worlds.

Marine mammal acoustics
Leighton's explanation of how humpback whales use sound when feeding in bubble nets is now a staple explanation on whale tour boats. He explained how dolphins can echolocate while producing bubble nets to hunt, a process that should blind their sonar.

Inventions

Medical and healthcare
Leighton invented systems for: 
 detecting bone disease (including osteoporosis). 
 monitoring the efficiency of kidney stone therapy (an invention that won the 2008 ‘Medical & Healthcare’ award from ‘The Engineer’ with key collaborator: Guy's and St Thomas' NHS Foundation Trust). 
 solutions for needle-free injectors for migraine sufferers (over 1 million sold).

and assisted the Institute of Cancer Research with technology for tumour therapy monitoring (2010).

Two billion people have been scanned in the womb under the guidelines he helped co-author for the World Federation for Ultrasound in Medicine and Biology guidelines for foetal ultrasonic scanning.

He served on the Government of the United Kingdom's Working Group of the Advisory Committee on Dangerous Pathogens Transmissible Spongiform Encephalopathies Sub Group and advised the Health Protection Agency and the International Commission on Non-Ionizing Radiation Protection  on the safety of ultrasound.

Other medical and healthcare inventions and breakthroughs are listed below under Sloan Water Technology Ltd., Global-NAMRIP and HEFUA.

Humanitarian

Leighton invented:
 radar for the detection of buried explosives, hidden bugging devices, and for the location of buried catastrophe victims (in avalanches, mudslides, collapsed buildings etc.)
 the world's only sonar system capable of detecting objects in bubbly water (key, for example, to protecting services, cargo and aid shipping in conflict zones). - mine detection is often an ongoing problem long after conflict has reduced and civilians return to former conflict zones (key collaborator: Paul White) 
 a number of systems for detecting objects buried in the seabed

and, in collaboration with the National Oceanography Centre, one sold by Kongsberg for archaeological and civil engineering purposes. Various collaborations are looking at ways of providing clean water from waste in Low- and Middle-Income Countries, including mentorships of young entrepreneurs in Africa.

Environmental and Safety

Leighton: 
 devised and conducted the experiment that revealed that the amount of carbon dioxide dissolving into the oceans was much greater than the values previously used in predicting climate change and ocean acidification; 
 invented technology used by environmental agencies and oil and gas companies to monitor for undersea gas leaks from pipelines, and from methane seeps, by their acoustic emissions. 
 devised the theory and methodology by which sonar could be used to monitor and quantify gas leaks from carbon capture and storage facilities in the seabed. This was later included as part of large-scale multinational trials on the North Sea seabed and elsewhere to assess leakage 
 systems assess the amount of methane in the seabed. This is important to assess the potential for leaks from these reserves into the sea and (eventually) the atmosphere (in the seabed, there is probably more carbon trapped in methane than there is in all other forms of conventional fossil fuel, yet as a greenhouse gas methane is 20 times more potent per molecule than carbon dioxide, so assessing how much is in the seabed, and how much leaks into the atmosphere, is a key task). 
 devised theory and methodology for measuring key parameters in the transfer of atmospheric gas between atmosphere and ocean, that was later included in large-scale multi-national trials This is important for climate change modelling, because over 1000 million tonnes of atmospheric carbon transfers each year between atmosphere and ocean.
 Inventions assist safety in the world's most powerful pulsed spallation neutron source ($1.3 billion) at the Oak Ridge National Laboratory in the United States.

Sloan Water Technology Ltd.

In the late 1980s, Leighton discovered a new ultrasonic signal that he identified as due to surface waves on the walls of gas bubbles in liquids. Multidisciplinary research in the following 11 parallel streams of work turned this discovery into Sloan Water Technology Ltd:
 Theory of how to stimulate these surface waves;
 measurement of the liquid convection and shear they generate; theory on how sound causes the bubbles to generate cracks; 
 theory for acoustics in porous materials (leading to the first theory to show why passing ultrasound through different directions in the human ankle could monitor osteoporosis); 
 the world's first measurements of the bubble size distribution for industry and in the ocean surf zone, leading to ocean measurements necessary to predict the climatological significance of the transfer of carbon dioxide between atmosphere and ocean. It also provided techniques for measurement in industrial pipelines which led to sensors for the oil and gas, carbon capture and storage, ceramics and nuclear industries.
 measurement of the liquid convection and shear from these surface waves; theory on how sound causes the bubbles to generate cracks;
 acoustic losses in water surrounded on all sides by air and containing microscopic natural particles; 
 acoustic propagation down straight columns of liquid with pressure release walls, and the effect of bubbles within such columns;
 acoustic propagation down curved columns of fluid, and how horns could facilitate this;
 use of acoustic pulses to enhance bubble activity;
 controlled bubble generation;
 how these bubbles affect living cells and surfaces. 
These 11 streams of fundamental research represented the knowledge on which Sloan Water Technology Ltd. was founded. It is currently producing technology for cleaning and changing surfaces using only cold water, air bubbles and sound (without chemicals or drugs). This reduces the use of water and electricity, reduces pollution and has run-off that is easier to convert back to drinking water, and reduces the threat of ‘superbugs’.

Sloan Water Technology Ltd. has invented technology for cleaning surgical instruments
Food cleaning inventions have been developed for salad (which cannot be sterilized by heat treatment, and each year results in serious illness and even death from E. Coli contamination)  and hay (to reduce respiratory illness contracted through animal feed).  
Sloan Water Technology’s most significant product is aimed at reducing the suffering from chronic wounds, which cause huge suffering and costs the UK NHS over £5-billion per year.

Awards and honours
Leighton has been awarded the following medals and distinctions:

Medals

 the 2017 Clifford Paterson Lecture and Medal of the Royal Society (video of Lecture here)
 the 2014 Rayleigh Medal of the Institute of Acoustics
 the 2013 Helmholtz-Rayleigh Interdisciplinary Silver Medal of the Acoustical Society of America
 the 2009 R W B Stephens Medal of the Institute of Acoustics
 the 2006 Paterson Medal of the Institute of Physics
 the inaugural 2004 Early Career Medal and Award of the International Commission for Acoustics
 the 2002 Tyndall Medal of the Institute of Acoustics
 the 1994 A. B. Wood Medal of the Institute of Acoustics

The citation of the 2006 Paterson Medal of the Institute of Physics states that:

Awards

 2019 Doctor of Science, University of Cambridge
 2018 Royal Society's Lord Leonard and Lady Estelle Wolfson Foundation Translation Award for the StarHealer
 the 2014 'Best new product of the year' award for StarStream
 the 2012 Institute of Chemical Engineering Award for Water Management and Supply
 the 2011 Royal Society Brian Mercer Award for Innovation
 the 2008 'Medical & Healthcare' award from 'The Engineer'
 the inaugural 2001 International Medwin Prize for Acoustical Oceanography from the Acoustical Society of America

Fellowships
Leighton is an Academician of three National Academies. He was elected a Fellow of the Royal Society (FRS) in 2014. His nomination reads: 

In 2018 he was elected to Fellowship of the Academy of Medical Sciences, the citation reading for 'harnessing the physical sciences for the benefit of patients' as: 

Leighton was elected a Fellow of the Royal Academy of Engineering (FREng) in 2012 for his services to Engineering and society. He was elected a Fellow of the Institute of Physics (FInstP) in 2000, Fellowship of Institute of Acoustics in 1999, Fellowship of the Acoustical Society of America in 1998, and Fellowship of the Cambridge Philosophical Society in 1988. He is a Visiting Fellow of the Institute of Advanced Studies of Loughborough University.

In 2018 the International Institute of Acoustics and Vibration (IIAV), of which he had not been a member, undertook a change to its Bylaws, and vote of all IIAV members, to create new rank of Distinguished Fellow. It is the highest rank for individual IIAV members of this international body, and Professor Leighton was the recipient in its inaugural year.

Outreach, TV and radio work
Leighton has developed and conducted multiply-award-winning outreach activities to the public, and to encourage of young men and women to engage, and possibly follow careers in, science and engineering, with school visits, science fairs, exhibits, games, and appearances on TV and radio.
His public engagement work regarding his invention, “The most dangerous game in the world”, which he designed to communicate with the public on the issue of superbugs and how they can protect themselves and society, was mentioned by Steve Brine MP, the Under-Secretary of State for Health on 16 November 2017. The IMDb and "Who's Who" have collated entries for Professor Leighton. In his 2014 book 'Sonic Wonderland', the broadcaster Trevor Cox described Professor Leighton as 'a middle-aged Harry Potter'.

References

Living people
Fellows of the Royal Society
Fellows of the Royal Academy of Engineering
Fellows of the Institute of Physics
1963 births
Alumni of Magdalene College, Cambridge